were a Japanese rock band formed in 1967 at Kyoto's Doshisha University.

History
Les Rallizes Dénudés was formed in 1967 by a group of students at Kyoto's Doshisha University. Initially, the band planned to record in a studio, but after being dissatisfied with the results, agreed to exclusively play live shows.

The band was initially active between 1967 and 1988, and then again briefly between 1993 and 1996 before permanently disbanding. The band's style is typified by simple, repetitious instrumental passages, shrieking, cacophonous guitar feedback and folk arrangement. Their discography is made up mostly of live bootlegs, soundboard archives, and even a few rare aborted studio recording attempts. Archive releases on independent labels such as Univive, Rivista, Phoenix, and Bamboo exist, as well as releases from former members and affiliates of the band. Three records and one 7" from Rivista (77 Live, '67-'69 Studio et Live, Mizutani, and Romance of the Black Grief / Otherwise Fallin' Love With respectively) released in 1991 are the only archival records purported to be official by the estate of Takashi Mizutani.  

Although the band itself was not explicitly political, members were known to participate in various protests, with the band even performing at a university auditorium while it was held by students during a protest. In 1970, original bassist Moriaki Wakabayashi, who was known to have attended several of these protests, assisted in the hijacking of Japan Airlines Flight 351 orchestrated by the Communist League's "Red Army Faction."

Very little is known about the band's frontman Takashi Mizutani, aside from his former affiliation with members of the Japanese Red Army and involvement early on in theater at Doshisha University. After the hijacking of Flight 351, Mizutani became extremely paranoid and went into hiding for many years, only occasionally emerging to play shows. The last appearance of Les Rallizes Dénudés was a concert at Club Citta in Tokyo, on October 4th 1996. The last public appearances of Takashi Mizutani without the  Rallizes moniker were two live performances in 1997 with jazz saxophonist Arthur Doyle and drummer Sabu Toyozumi. 

A live film about the band was released on VHS in 1992 by an independent filmmaker named Ethan Mousiké (who many believe to be a pseudonym of Mizutani), consisting of over 2 hours of live footage of the band. 

In October 2021, an official website was launched for the band by record label The Last One Musique, claiming to be a collaborative effort by former band members and associates of Mizutani. It announced its intention to release official Rallizes recordings with "more alive and striking sound than the bootlegs that have been circulating over twenty years". The website states on its homepage that Mizutani passed away in 2019, and this is further supported by statements from Aquilha Mochiduki (sometimes spelled Mochizuki), a photographer associated with Les Rallizes Dénudés. In a 2020 interview, former member Makoto Kubota (who is himself credited on the official website) stated that he had conversed with Mizutani through phone calls in which he told him that his band had become popular in America and that it could even possible for the band to play a revival concert there. The article was amended on 28 October 2021 to state that the phone calls had taken place in late 2019, before Mizutani's passing.

Discography

Official releases
Releases that have been authorized or released officially by the band.

Other appearances

Bootleg releases
Significant or well-known bootlegs include:
 Blind Baby Has Its Mother's Eyes
 Cable Hogue Soundtrack (2007)
 Double Heads
 Tripical Midbooster Winter 1981-82
 France Demo Tape
 Great White Wonder
 Heavier Than a Death in the Family (2002)
 Mars Studio 1980
 
 Yodogo-A-Go-Go

References

Further reading
 Cope, Julian (2007). "Japrocksampler", Bloomsbury Publishing.

External links
 Official Les Rallizes Dénudés site
 Unofficial Les Rallizes Dénudés site (Japanese)

Outsider musicians
Japanese psychedelic rock music groups
Protopunk groups
Musical groups established in 1967
1967 establishments in Japan
Musical groups disestablished in 1996
1996 disestablishments in Japan
Japanese noise rock groups